Khvoshinan-e Sofla (also Romanized as Khvoshīnān-e Soflá and Khūshīnān-e Soflá; also known as Deh Kūr, Khoshnīān-e Soflá, Khushinān ‘Āzam, Khvoshī Nān-e A‘z̧am, and Khvoshīnān-e Deh Kūr) is a village in Miyan Darband Rural District, in the Central District of Kermanshah County, Kermanshah Province, Iran. At the 2006 census, its population was 176, in 40 families.

References 

Populated places in Kermanshah County